Oklahoma's 4th congressional district is located in south-central Oklahoma and covers (in whole or in part) a total of 15 counties. Its principal cities include Midwest City, Norman, Moore, Ada, Duncan, Lawton/Ft. Sill, and Ardmore.  The district also includes much of southern Oklahoma City.

The district is currently represented by Republican Tom Cole.

As with the rest of the state, the district gives GOP candidates wide margins - George W. Bush received 61 percent of the vote in 2000, 67% in 2004 and John McCain received 66% of the vote in 2008.

Geography
The district borders Texas along the Red River to the south. To the north, the district includes a very small square-shaped portion of south-central Oklahoma County (enough to capture the city of Midwest City) and then Cleveland, McClain, Grady, Garvin, Murray, Pontotoc, Comanche, Tillman, Cotton, Stephens, Jefferson, Carter,  and Love counties.

Demographics
The district is 63 percent urban, 5 percent Latino, and 3.5 percent foreign-born.

Recent results from statewide elections

List of members representing the district

Recent electoral history

 In 2010, no Democrat or independent candidate filed to run in the district. The results printed here are from the Republican primary, where the election was decided.

Historical district boundaries

See also

Oklahoma's congressional districts
List of United States congressional districts

References

 Congressional Biographical Directory of the United States 1774–present

04